Captain Alvarez is a 1914 Vitagraph's five-reel film, based on a stage play. Written by Marguerite Bertsch, and directed by Rollin S. Sturgeon.

Plot
A melodrama about an American who becomes a revolutionary leader battling evil government spies in Argentina. William Desmond Taylor portrays the title role, and  Denis Gage Deane-Tanner, Taylor's younger brother, is thought to have played the small role of a blacksmith.

Cast
Edith Storey
William Desmond Taylor
George Stanley	
George Holt
Otto Lederer
Myrtle Gonzalez
George Kunkel

Reception 
Louis Reeves Harrison, writing for The Moving Picture World, gave a overview of the story and complemented the acting and the casting, noting that "Director Sturgeon has done well with his company and his setting".

References

External links

1914 films
American silent feature films
American black-and-white films
Silent American drama films
1914 drama films
American films based on plays
Vitagraph Studios films
Films directed by Rollin S. Sturgeon
Films set in Argentina
1910s American films